Kerstin Lindblad-Toh is a scientist in comparative genomics, specializing in mammalian genetics. She is the Scientific Director of vertebrate genomics at the Broad Institute and a professor in comparative genomics at Uppsala University. In 2010 she co-founded Science for Life Laboratory (SciLifeLab) together with Mathias Uhlén and acted as Co-Director until 2015. As the leader of the Broad Institute's Mammalian Genome Initiative she has led the effort to sequence and analyze the genomes of various mammals, including mouse, dog, chimpanzee, horse, rabbit and opossum. She has researched extensively on the genetics of dogs, identifying genes and genetic variants important in disease susceptibility, morphology and behavior.

Lindblad-Toh is elected to the National Academy of Sciences of the United States and the Royal Swedish Academy of Sciences.

Education and early career 
Lindblad-Toh was born 1970 in Stockholm, Sweden. She studied molecular biology as an undergraduate at Karolinska Institute. In 1988, she received her Ph.D. from the Department of Molecular Medicine at Karolinska Institute. She worked on several projects as a postdoctoral fellow at the Whitehead Institute/MIT Center for Genome Research together with Eric Lander, including mouse SNP discovery, the development of genotyping technologies and association studies in human disease. In 2002, she co-authored the paper describing the initial genome sequence of the mouse, and in 2005 she published the first genome sequence of the domestic dog.

Awards and honors 

 European Young Investigator Award, 2007 
 The Swedish Fernström Prize, 2009 
 Thuréus Prize, 2010 
 Elected member of the Royal Swedish Academy of Sciences, 2012 
 Wallenberg Scholar, 2013 
 Distinguished Professor Grant, Swedish Research Council, 2014 
 Göran Gustafsson Prize, 2013 
 Björkén Prize, 2017 
 Honorary doctorate of veterinary medicine by the Faculty of Veterinary Medicine and Animal Science at the Swedish University of Agricultural Sciences, 2019 
 Elected to the National Academy of Sciences of the United States, 2020

References 

Swedish biologists
Academic staff of Uppsala University
Karolinska Institute alumni
Members of the Royal Swedish Academy of Sciences
1970 births
Living people
Swedish women academics